The Tumut Hydroelectric Power Stations is a series of three hydroelectric power stations on the Tumut River in New South Wales, Australia, that are part of the Snowy Mountains Scheme.

The generating assets of the three Tumut power stations are owned by Snowy Hydro Limited, a company whose shareholders include the governments of Australia, New South Wales, and Victoria. The company is also licensed to manage the water rights used by the power stations.

Stations

Tumut 1 Underground Power Station
A Lift & Ventilation Shaft is on Happy Valley Rd.
The power station was completed in 1959, and has  rated head.

The first 330 kV transmission lines were commissioned in New South Wales at the Tumut 1 Power Station during the 1950s. These cables were manufactured in England and linked to the underground transformers at Tumut 1, and connected with the transmission line. The lines carried power to Sydney where new sub-stations were established, to handle the upgrade from 132 kV transmission lines. This innovative plan, which faced significant scepticism initially, was considered to be at the forefront of technology which challenged designers and overseas manufacturers. Extra high voltage was in its infancy in the early 1950s. The lines were subject to a 1000 kV test on the cables prior to them going into service. These cables and the transmission system have been in service for over 50 years.

The station is connected to the National Electricity Market via the 330kV Upper Tumut Switching Station,  North of Cabramurra.

The Upper Tumut Works is sometimes used as a colloquial term to refer to both Tumut 1 and Tumut 2 Underground Power Stations as well as their respective dams, tunnels and the Upper Tumut Switching Station.

Tumut 2 Underground Power Station
The power station was completed in 1962, and has  rated head.

The conventional gravity-fed hydroelectric power station is fed by water held in Tumut Two Pondage and from water discharged from Tumut 1 Power Station.

The station is connected to the National Electricity Market via the 330kV Upper Tumut Switching Station,  North of Cabramurra.

Tumut 3 Power Station
Tumut 3 Power Station is the first major pumped storage hydroelectric power station in Australia. Pump-storage schemes use off-peak energy to pump water to a reservoir on a higher level. This water then passes through turbines to generate electricity when prices are higher. The sole powerhouse is located above ground, below Talbingo Dam.

Three of the six units can operate as pumps. The design for the power station was managed by Peter Hughes AM. It was completed in 1973, upgraded in 2012 and has  rated head.

During 2003, Snowy Hydro commissioned six  micro-hydro generators on the existing cooling water systems on each of the six generating units at Tumut 3 Power Station. In addition, this installation not only captures previous wasted renewable energy, but also will be substantially reducing the noise that was associated with the previous pressure reducing valves on the six generating unit's cooling systems.

The station is connected to the National Electricity Market via the 330kV Lower Tumut Switching Station, 500m North West of Tumut 3 or 3.0 km south of south-west from Talbingo.

See also

 List of power stations in New South Wales
 List of dams and reservoirs in New South Wales

References

External links 

 
 
 

Snowy Mountains Scheme
Pumped-storage hydroelectric power stations in Australia
1959 establishments in Australia
1962 establishments in Australia
1973 establishments in Australia